Thomas Joseph Errity (born 3 November 1969) is an Irish retired hurler who played for club side Birr and at inter-county level with the Offaly senior hurling team.

Honours

Birr Community School
All-Ireland Colleges Senior Hurling Championship: 1986
Leinster Colleges Senior Hurling Championship: 1985, 1986

Birr
All-Ireland Senior Club Hurling Championship: 1995, 1998, 2002, 2003
Leinster Senior Club Hurling Championship: 1991, 1994, 1997, 1999, 2001, 2002
Offaly Senior Hurling Championship: 1991, 1994, 1997, 1999, 2000, 2001, 2002, 2003, 2005

Offaly
All-Ireland Senior Hurling Championship: 1994, 1998
Leinster Senior Hurling Championship: 1994, 1995
All-Ireland Minor Hurling Championship: 1986, 1987 
Leinster Minor Hurling Championship: 1986, 1987

Leinster
Railway Cup: 1998

References

1969 births
Living people
Birr hurlers
Offaly inter-county hurlers
Leinster inter-provincial hurlers
Hurling goalkeepers
All-Ireland Senior Hurling Championship winners